The Purpe - is a river in Yamalo-Nenets Autonomous Okrug, Russia. 	
The most significant tributary is the Puritey (left).

Flooding normally begins in May, sometimes at the end of April, peaking in two weeks and will end in the second half of June. The average duration of approximately two months, from mid-May to mid-July. In summer and autumn are generally low rainfall floods. The most abounding month - June, the low - March and April. River freezes usually in the second - the third decade of October, an average of 18 - 20 numbers, opened at the end of May. Freeze and an autopsy is accompanied by short ice. The average length of ice about 220 days. The average thickness of the ice at the end of winter 80 – 85 cm River are some deposits of hydrocarbon raw materials (Umseyskoe, Gubkinskoe, Purpeyskoe Southern, Eastern Purpeyskoe, Novopur-peyskoe, Komsomolskaya, North Komsomolskaya etc.)

References

Rivers of Yamalo-Nenets Autonomous Okrug